Hawkins Peak is a small summit peak on a mostly ice covered and rounded mass located  southeast of Mount Murphy, in Marie Byrd Land, Antarctica. It was mapped by the United States Geological Survey from surveys and U.S. Navy air photos, 1959–66, and was named by the Advisory Committee on Antarctic Names for Major Billy R. Hawkins, a member of the U.S. Army Aviation Detachment in Antarctica, 1966–67.

References

Mountains of Marie Byrd Land